Rannstedt is a village and a former municipality in the Weimarer Land district of Thuringia, Germany. On 1 January 2023 it became part of the town Bad Sulza.

References

Weimarer Land
Grand Duchy of Saxe-Weimar-Eisenach
Former municipalities in Thuringia